William Bliss may refer to:

 William Blowers Bliss (1795–1874), lawyer, judge and politician in Nova Scotia
 William Dwight Porter Bliss (1856–1926), American religious leader and activist
 William Bliss (mill owner), for whom Bliss Tweed Mill at Chipping Norton is named.
 William Henry Bliss (1835–1911), English scholar
 William Wallace Smith Bliss (1815–1853), U.S. Army Officer

See also
 William Bliss Baker (1859–1886), American painter
 William Bliss Pine (1877–1942), U.S. Senator